Thetford is a town in Orange County, Vermont, United States in the Connecticut River Valley. The population was 2,775 at the 2020 census. Villages within the town include East Thetford, North Thetford, Thetford Hill, Thetford Center, Rices Mills, Union Village, and Post Mills. The town office is in Thetford Center.

Thetford is home to Thetford Academy, Vermont's oldest secondary school. Girl Scouts of the Green and White Mountains, formerly Swift Water Girl Scout Council, also has a summer residential camp here called Camp Farnsworth. Camp Farnsworth originally started under private ownership by Chelebe and Madama Farnsworth in 1909 when it was called Camp Hanoum.

History

The town was created on August 12, 1761 by way of a royal charter which King George III of Great Britain issued to Governor Benning Wentworth of New Hampshire. Wentworth named it for Augustus Henry Fitzroy, 3rd Duke of Grafton, 4th Earl of Arlington and 4th Viscount Thetford, who in 1768 became prime minister. It was first settled in 1764 by John Chamberlin, who lived at East Thetford beside the Connecticut River. He was an agent for one of 62 proprietors (51 from Hebron, Connecticut).

In 1910, the Camp Fire Girls were founded locally. This became a national organization within two years.

Gove Hill Retreat, a nonprofit Christian Retreat center, was founded in 1966 in Thetford Center. The center supplied hospitality to religious, educational and other non-profit organizations.  The retreat was sited on property originally owned by John Gove, the first farmer and name sake of Gove Hill. It was closed December 31, 2013 after the American Baptist Churches of Vermont and New Hampshire (ABCVNH) decided the yearly upkeep was not worth it. The retreat center had run a deficit for a number of years. The Pastor's larger salary were both believed to be factors in the closing of the doors.

Geography
According to the United States Census Bureau, the town has a total area of 44.2 square miles (114.4 km2), of which 43.6 square miles (112.8 km2) is land and 0.6 square mile (1.6 km2) (1.36%) is water. It is bordered on the east by the Connecticut River, and the Ompompanoosuc River flows through the town.  Interstate Highway 91 traverses it.

The town has six active, unincorporated villages: Thetford Hill, Thetford Center, East Thetford, North Thetford, Rice Mills, and Post Mills.

Demographics

As of the census of 2000, there were 2,617 people, 1,032 households and 730 families residing in the town.  The population density was 60.1 people per square mile (23.2/km2).  There were 1,193 housing units at an average density of 27.4 per square mile (10.6/km2).  The racial makeup of the town was 97.44% White, 0.46% African American, 0.23% Native American, 0.57% Asian, 0.19% from other races, and 1.11% from two or more races. Hispanic or Latino of any race were 0.46% of the population.

There were 1,032 households, out of which 36.8% had children under the age of 18 living with them, 59.4% were married couples living together, 7.1% had a female householder with no husband present, and 29.2% were non-families. 23.2% of all households were made up of individuals, and 6.6% had someone living alone who was 65 years of age or older.  The average household size was 2.54 and the average family size was 3.00.

In the town, the population was spread out, with 26.9% under the age of 18, 5.5% from 18 to 24, 29.8% from 25 to 44, 27.4% from 45 to 64, and 10.3% who were 65 years of age or older.  The median age was 39 years. For every 100 females, there were 94.6 males.  For every 100 females age 18 and over, there were 90.5 males.

The median income for a household in the town was $48,333, and the median income for a family was $55,323. Males had a median income of $35,121 versus $29,839 for females. The per capita income for the town was $22,870.  About 4.0% of families and 5.7% of the population were below the poverty line, including 8.8% of those under age 18 and 6.9% of those age 65 or over.

Educational and cultural institutions

Thetford Elementary School on Thetford Hill serves town resident students from Kindergarten through 6th grade. The town then sends its middle and high school students primarily to Thetford Academy, an independent secondary school, in lieu of a public high school.

Open Fields School on Thetford Hill is a private and alternative elementary school that serves children from kindergarten through 6th grade.

The Post Mills Church and the Vermontasaurus are cultural attractions in Post Mills.

Notable people 

 Augustus A. Bird, Wisconsin state legislator
 Malcolm Browne, Pulitzer Prize–winning journalist
 Mills O. Burnham, born in Thetford. Member, Florida House of Representatives
 William Closson, artist
 Ruth Dwyer, 1998 and 2000 Republican nominee for Governor
 John Eaton, brigadier general
 Louise Woodworth Foss, elocutionist
 Alonzo Jackman, Norwich University professor and brigadier general
 Eugene Frederick Ladd, brigadier general
 Anne Lindbergh, author and daughter of Charles Lindbergh and Anne Morrow Lindbergh
 Gustavus Loomis, brigadier general
 Harvey Newcomb, clergyman and writer
 Grace Paley, National Book Award-winning fiction writer and poet
 Noel Perrin, essayist
 Annie Proulx, author
 James S. Shapiro, professor
 Henry Wells, businessman and co-founder of Wells Fargo, American Express, and Wells College
 Dean Conant Worcester, zoologist, public official, and authority on the Philippines

References

Further reading
 History of Thetford, Vermont
 Virtual Vermont

External links
 Town of Thetford official website
 Thetford Library Federation
 Thetford Historical Society

 
Towns in Vermont
Vermont populated places on the Connecticut River
Towns in Orange County, Vermont